Vitis sinocinerea, commonly known as the lobular grape or small-leaved grape, is a species of climbing vine in the grape family ranging widely over much of the Chinese mainland (Fujian, Hubei, Hunan, Jiangsu, Jiangx, Yunnan, Zhejiang) as well as Taiwan. In Chinese 
it is known as xiao ye pu tao, which can be translated as small-leaved grape. Its natural habitat is within forested or shrubby hills (200–2800 m. elev.).

Vitis sinocinerea flowers in May and June, bearing fruit from July to October. It has calyptrate flower petals and the pistils are non-functional in male flowers. Its berries are usually 6–0 mm. in diameter, and darkly purple to black.

A holotype specimen was first collected of this species by E. H. Wilson from Xingshan Xian, in Hubei province, China in June 1907, who said it was 'climbing or prostrate over rocks, 600–1200 m.' Its characteristics were later (1911) described by François Gagnepain, and given the name of cinerea, a variety of V. thunbergii.

External links
Flora of China: Vitis sinocinerea
Plants of the World Online: Vitis sinocinerea

Gallery
https://upload.wikimedia.org/wikipedia/commons/0/01/V._sinocinerea_2.jpg
https://upload.wikimedia.org/wikipedia/commons/c/c2/V._sinocinerea_3.jpg
https://upload.wikimedia.org/wikipedia/commons/e/e1/V._sinocinerea_4.jpg

References

sinocinerea
Plants described in 1911
Flora of China
Flora of Taiwan